10 Years and Gunnin' is a greatest hits CD by M.O.P. The album name is a reference to N.W.A's LP 100 Miles and Runnin'.

Tracks

Charts

References

M.O.P. compilation albums
Albums produced by DJ Premier
2003 greatest hits albums
Columbia Records compilation albums